The National Council of Churches of Burundi (known as CNEB) is a federation of Protestant Churches in Burundi. It traces its lineage to the Alliance of Protestant Missions in Ruanda-Urundi (Alliance des Missions Protestantes du Ruanda-Urundi) established in 1935 which became the Protestant Alliance of Burundi (Alliance Protestante du Burundi) on independence. It received its current name in 1989. It is a member of the World Council of Churches and the Fellowship of Christian Councils and Churches in the Great Lakes and Horn of Africa.

External links 
 
World Council of Churches listing

Christian organizations established in 1935
National councils of churches
Members of the World Council of Churches
Christian organizations based in Africa
Protestantism in Burundi
1935 establishments in Ruanda-Urundi